Wilfred Nalani "Moe" Keale (December 3, 1939 – April 15, 2002) was an American musician of Hawaiian music, a ukulele virtuoso, and an actor.  He was the uncle and major musical influence of Israel Kamakawiwoʻole.

He died from a heart attack on 15 April 2002, aged 62.

Early life
He was one of the few persons born in the 20th century to have full Hawaiian ancestry. His father was a kahuna.  Moe Keale was born on the island of Niihau, but raised on Oahu.  He was shaped by the ancestral customs and values of his birthplace, learning to play the ukulele at the age of four.   Conversations in his Niihau family home were in Hawaiian, and songs were passed from generation to generation. He would later fondly recall his summers on Niihau, where stress was not part of the lifestyle. "I figured that heaven must be something like Niihau," he said.

Career
A native of Hawaii, he primarily had roles in movies and TV series that took place in the islands, including many appearances on Hawaii Five-O, where he had a recurring part as Truck Kealoha in the show's final season. He also appeared as Officer O'Shaughnessy on the Hawaiian-based NBC sitcom, The Brian Keith Show.

He was a beachboy, musician and singer, part-time electrician, and radio deejay, as well as an actor. His first paid musical gig with his group the Four K's was at the Waikiki Tavern circa 1958, followed by the Tropical Club in Kailua-Kona.  In 1964, he worked with the Puka Puka Otea Tahitian Show at Queen's Surf.  He was recruited for a New York city gig when he was seen at a beach doing high dives off a simulated waterfall.   His most noted role as Truck on Hawaii Five-O came as a result of his working as an electrician on the set.

Keale and Eddie Kamae struck up a musical partnership that led to Moe becoming part of the Sons of Hawaii in 1969, and he remained with the group until 1977.  He then went on to make three solo albums South Sea Island Magic, Aloha Is A Part of Me, A Part of You,  and Imagine. He was a deejay on KCCN in the 1980s.

From 1984 onward, he and his band played two evenings a week poolside at the Sheraton Waikiki.

At the time of his death, he was a hands-on co-owner of the Lomi Shop’s Keiki Wa‘a at the Hyatt Regency Waikiki Resort and Spa at Windward Mall.  The Lomi Shop promoted the art of healing through lomilomi massage.

Moe had a near-fatal heart attack in April 2001 and received a pacemaker implant.  He used his extension on life to raise $260,000 for the American Heart Association, in order to have portable defibrillators strategically positioned throughout the state of Hawaii.

He died on 15 April 2002 from a heart attack, aged 62.

Recognition
In 2003, the Hawai'i Academy of Recording Arts instituted the Moe Keale "Aloha Is" Award in its Na Hoku Hanohano Awards.

Discography

Hawaii's Treasure: Uncle Moe Keale Live in Waikiki CD 0888 (Booklines)
South Sea Island Magic (2000) CD 2059 (Mountain Apple)
Imagine (1996) CD 1005 (Ord)
Aloha Is a Part of Me (1995) CD 6426  (Surfside)

Filmography

Picture Bride (1994)

Film and Television work

The Brian Keith Show (1972, TV Series) - Officer O'Shaugnessy
Sanford and Son (1976, TV Series) - Davis' Thug
Danger in Paradise (1977, TV Movie) - Garfield
Big Hawaii (1977, TV Series) - Garfield Kalahani
Stickin' Together (1978) - Big Ben Kalkini
The Islander (1978, TV Movie) - Henchman
Pearl (1978, TV Mini-Series) - Sergeant
The MacKenzies of Paradise Cove (1979, TV Series) - Big Ben Kalikini
The Paradise Connection (1979) - Driver
Hawaii Five-O (1971–1980, TV Series) -  Det. Truck Kealoha
M Station: Hawaii (1980) - Truck Kealoha
Charlie's Angels (1980, TV Series) - Chin
Hawaiian Heat (1984, TV Movie) - Jinbo
Gidget's Summer Reunion (1985, TV Movie) - Bob the Driver
Blood and Orchids (1986, TV Movie) - Roy Manakula
Magnum, P.I. (1981–1987, TV Series) - Mortie the car rental dealer / Granville / Kaholo
Picture Bride (1994) - Hawaiian fisherman
Hawaii Five-O (1997, TV Movie) - Truck (final film role)

References

External links

1939 births
2002 deaths
People from Oahu
Native Hawaiian musicians
Male actors from Hawaii
Native Hawaiian people
People of the Territory of Hawaii
People from Niihau
20th-century American musicians